CIAF may refer to:

Cairns Indigenous Art Fair, an art fair in Cairns, Queensland, Australia
Comisión de Investigación de Accidentes Ferroviarios, a Spanish government agency which investigates rail accidents
Commissione Italiana d'Armistizio con la Francia,  a temporary civil and military body charged with implementing the 1940 Franco-Italian armistice